Kosmas (Makis) Tzatzos (born 6 November 1968 in Komanos, Ptolemaida), is a retired football player (attacking midfielder) who connected his name mainly with Xanthi F.C.

Career
His career began at his hometown, where he played for [eordaikos]. His skills and talent were spotted by Xanthi and soon he became a member of the team (1988). Tzatzos was regarded by the media as a class player and he is one of the main reasons why Xanthi F.C. won the second division championship and earned promotion to the Greek Superleague.

He played for Xanthi until 1995, when he joined Aris Thessaloniki F.C. For a year he offered his services at the Salonica team, only to return to Xanthi in the second half of the 1996/97 season.

Tzatzos played his last game for Xanthi and his last in the Greek first division in May 1997, and he made a total of 178 league appearances for the club. He returned to his first team (Anagennisi Karditsas) and closed his career at Leonidio in 2001.

References

1967 births
Living people
Greek footballers
Anagennisi Karditsa F.C. players
Xanthi F.C. players
Aris Thessaloniki F.C. players
Association football midfielders
Footballers from Ptolemaida